Caraphia squamosa is a species of beetle in the family Cerambycidae. It was described by Chemsak and Linsley in 1984. It is found in the Southern regions of Mexico.

References

Lepturinae
Beetles described in 1984